Next Goal Wins may refer to:

Next Goal Wins (2014 film), a 2014 documentary film
Next Goal Wins (2023 film), an upcoming comedy film by Taika Waititi